The Ankara Cup is a tournament for professional female tennis players, played on indoor hardcourts. The event is classified as a $50,000 ITF Women's Circuit tournament and has been held annually in Ankara, Turkey, from 2011 to 2016.

Past finals

Singles

Doubles

External links
 Official website
 ITF search

 
ITF Women's World Tennis Tour
Hard court tennis tournaments
Tennis tournaments in Turkey
Recurring sporting events established in 2011